Leme may refer to the following places:

Brazil
 Leme, Rio de Janeiro, neighborhood in Rio de Janeiro
 Leme, São Paulo, municipality in the state of São Paulo

France
 Lème, commune in the Pyrénées-Atlantiques department
 Lemé, commune in the Aisne department

See also
 Lim (Croatia), a watercourse whose Italian name is Canale di Leme